Dzhinabi (Kaitag: Ччинаби; Dargwa: Жинаби) is a rural locality (a selo) in Kaytagsky District, Republic of Dagestan, Russia. The population was 710 as of 2010. There are 26 streets.

Geography 
Dzhinabi is located 11 km southeast of Madzhalis (the district's administrative centre) by road. Kartalay and Karatsan are the nearest rural localities.

Nationalities 
Dargins live there.

References 

Rural localities in Kaytagsky District